Hollman Camilo McCormick Pinzón 
(born 28 October 2005) is a Colombian-Irish footballer who currently plays as a forward for Independiente Santa Fe.

Club career
At the age of 14, McCormick made his professional debut with Independiente Santa Fe in a 3–1 Copa Colombia win against Patriotas Boyacá on 22 October 2020. On 12 May 2021 he made his Copa Libertadores debut in 2021 Copa Libertadores loss to Fluminense. The 15-year-old Colombian became the fifth-youngest player ever to appear in the Copa Libertadores.

International career 
He received his first call-up to the Colombia under-17 team in November 2020.

References

External links
 Profile at the Independiente Santa Fe website
 

2005 births
Living people
Colombian footballers
Association football forwards
Independiente Santa Fe
Footballers from Bogotá